Yuli B. Rudyak is a professor of Mathematics at the University of Florida in Gainesville, Florida.  He obtained his doctorate from Moscow State University under the supervision of M. M. Postnikov.  His main research interests are
geometry and topology and symplectic topology.

Books

Reviewer Donald M. Davis (mathematician) for MathSciNet wrote: "This book provides an excellent and thorough treatment of various topics related to cobordism. It should become an indispensable tool for advanced graduate students and workers in algebraic topology."
The book listed 118 cites at Google Scholar in 2011.

Personal life
Rudyak is the father of Marina Rudyak, who is an Assistant Professor of Chinese Studies at the University of Heidelberg.

Notes

External links
 Webpage at UFL

Topologists
20th-century American mathematicians
University of Florida faculty
Moscow State University alumni
Living people
Year of birth missing (living people)
21st-century American mathematicians